Bagerhat Sadar is an upazila of Bagerhat District in the Division of Khulna, Bangladesh. The municipality was established in 1958. It consists of 9 wards and 31 mahallas.

History
Khan Jahan Ali established a pargana named Khalifatabad here in 1429 AD, which covered Bagerhat, Khulna, Jessore, Satkhira and Barisal. The Sixty Dome Mosque was the central administrative place of the kingdom. He built a mint, several mosques, and excavated several lakes.

During the Bangladesh Liberation War, Razakar Seraj Master killed 18 members of a family in the area. Battles between the Pakistan army and the Bangladeshi Freedom Fighters, the Mukti Bahini, were held at Panighat, Devir Bazar and Madhav Kathi.

Geography
Bagerhat Sadar has 45,527 households and a total area of 272.73 km2. Bagerhat Sadar Upazila is bounded by Fakirhat and Chitalmari upazilas on the north, Morrelganj upazila on the south, Kachua upazila on the east, Rampal and Fakirhat upazila on the west. The main rivers in the area are the Bhairab, Chitra, Daudkhali, Poylahar, and the Putimari.

Demographics
As of the 1991 Bangladesh census, Bagerhat Sadar has a population of 235,848. Bagerhat Sadar has an average literacy rate of 49.9% (7+ years), compared to the Bangladeshi national average of 32.4%.

Economy

Health organization
In Bagerhat Sadar, there is 1 250 bed government hospital bagerhat, 2 satellite clinics, 10 union health and family planning centers, 1 maternity clinic, 7 private clinics, and 2 nursing training schools.

Main crops
Paddy, wheat, jute, potato, banana and papaya, garlic, and onion are the main crops of Bagerhat Sadar.

Industry
Bagerhat Sadar had 28 spice grinding mills, 22 flour mills, 25 rice mills, and 28 coconut oil mill. Cottage industries include 70 goldsmiths, 40 blacksmiths, 60 welders, 1 honey cultivation project, and 1 bidi factory.

Arts and culture
The Mosque City of Bagerhat, a UNESCO-registered complex of Muslim architecture, is in the suburbs of Bagerhat city. Apart from the mosque recently Khan Jahan Ali's home has been dug out. Concerning modern culture, there are 4 public libraries, 1 museum, 2 cinemas, 25 rural clubs, 1 women's organization, and 1 playground in Bagerhat Sadar Upazila.
You can explore the UNESCO property in the Google Arts and Culture Platform Bagerhat on Google Arts and Culture

Administration
Bagerhat Sadar Upazila is divided into Bagerhat Municipality and ten union parishads: Baraipara, Bemarta, Bishnupur, Dema, Gotapara, Jatrapur, Karapara, Khanpur, Rakhalgachhi, and Shat Gambuj. The union parishads are subdivided into 185 mauzas and 187 villages.

Bagerhat Municipality is subdivided into 9 wards and 31 mahallas.

The current UP chairman is Sardar Nasir who was  this post for the 1st consecutive time in January 2018.

Notable residents
 Bidhubhushan Basu, social worker and writer, was born in Kanthal village in 1875.

See also
 Upazilas of Bangladesh
 Districts of Bangladesh
 Divisions of Bangladesh

References

 
Upazilas of Bagerhat District